In chemistry, a formula unit is the empirical formula of any ionic or covalent network solid compound used as an independent entity for stoichiometric calculations. It is the lowest whole number ratio of ions represented in an ionic compound.

Ionic compounds do not exist as individual molecules; a formula unit thus indicates the lowest reduced ratio of ions in the compound.

In mineralogy, as minerals are almost exclusively either ionic or network solids, the formula unit is used.  The number of formula units (Z) and the dimensions of the crystallographic axes are used in defining the unit cell.

References

Chemical formulas